The Red Tree (2001), written and illustrated by Shaun Tan, is a picture book that presents a fragmented journey through a dark world. The text is sparse and the illustrations are dark and surreal.

The story is based on images inspired by the experience of depression. The main character is a lonely red-headed girl who goes about her day feeling alienated, despondent, and lonely. The illustrations depict her in various abstract situations that metaphorically depict her feelings. Almost unnoticed in each picture is a small red leaf (symbolising hope). At the end, the little girl stands smiling at a beautiful red-leafed tree growing in her bedroom. This little tree that has now beautifully blossomed in the center of her room is symbolized as her reward for the hardships she has been through in her life. 

This book is one of many picture books by Tan, who also addresses issues such as immigration and cultural differences.

Awards
Winner of NSW Premier's Literary Award Patricia Wrightson Prize 2002
Shortlisted for APA Design Awards: Scholastic Best Designed Children's Book 2002
Shortlisted for Western Australian Premier's Book Awards: Children's Books 2009

References
 .
 .
 .
The Red Tree at WorldCat

2003 children's books
Australian picture books
Australian children's books
Lothian Books books